Soft and Sentimental is a 1955 album by Jo Stafford.

Track listing 

 "September in the Rain" (Harry Warren, Al Dubin)     
 "Early Autumn" (Ralph Burns, Woody Herman, Johnny Mercer)
 "I'm Always Chasing Rainbows" (Harry Carroll, Joseph McCarthy)      
 "Don't Worry 'bout Me" (Rube Bloom, Ted Koehler) - 3:01
 "Smoking My Sad Cigarette" (Bee Walker, Don George)
 "Love Is Here to Stay" (George Gershwin, Ira Gershwin) - 3:36

References 

1955 albums
Jo Stafford albums
Columbia Records albums